Epicauta atrata is a species of blister beetle in the family Meloidae. It is found in Central America and North America. This species is generally characterized by a red head, and an all black body. They attack the eggs of Epicauta vittata, a crop pest found in the East Coast.

References

 Pinto, John D. (1991). "The Taxonomy of North American Epicauta (Coleoptera: Meloidae), with a Revision of the Nominate Subgenus and a Survey of Courtship Behavior". University of California Publications in Entomology, vol. 110, x + 372.

Further reading

 Arnett, R.H. Jr., M. C. Thomas, P. E. Skelley and J. H. Frank. (eds.). (2002). American Beetles, Volume II: Polyphaga: Scarabaeoidea through Curculionoidea. CRC Press LLC, Boca Raton, FL.
 
 Richard E. White. (1983). Peterson Field Guides: Beetles. Houghton Mifflin Company.

Meloidae
Beetles described in 1775
Taxa named by Johan Christian Fabricius